Lawrence Kirkland Edwards Jr. (June 22, 1917 – August 11, 1989) was an American politician in the state of Florida and a Democrat.

Edwards was born in Irvine, Florida, and lived there his whole life. He was a farmer, rancher, and banker. He served in the Florida State Senate from 1955 to 1965 as a Democratic member for the 20th district. He also served from 1967 to 1969 for the 13th district.

References

1917 births
1989 deaths
People from Marion County, Florida
Businesspeople from Florida
Farmers from Florida
Democratic Party Florida state senators
Pork Chop Gang
20th-century American politicians
20th-century American businesspeople